Ytterhogdals IK is a Swedish football club located in Ytterhogdal. They currently compete in Division 2 Norrland, the fourth tier of Swedish football.

Background
Ytterhogdals IK currently plays in Division 2 Jämtland/Härjedalen which is the fourth tier of Swedish football. They play their home matches at the Svedjevallen in Ytterhogdal.

The club is affiliated to Jämtland-Härjedalens Fotbollförbund.

In October 2017, former Garforth Town boss Adrian Costello was appointed as manager of the club before the 2018 season start.

Squad

First team squad

Coaching staff
As of April 2021

Season to season

Footnotes

External links
 Ytterhogdals IK – Official website
 Ytterhogdals IK on Facebook

 
Football clubs in Jämtland County
1921 establishments in Sweden